William Jackson McLarty (April 24, 1919 – July 10, 2011) was a surrealist painter, printmaker, and teacher of the Pacific Northwest region of the United States.

History
Born in Seattle, Washington, he moved with his family to Portland, Oregon, in 1921. He attended Benson High School in Portland, the Portland Museum Art School, and the American Artists School in New York (1940–1941).  After two years in New York he returned to Portland, and in 1945 he began teaching at the Museum Art School where he remained until his retirement.

Media
McLarty worked in paint (oil, and later acrylic), print (lithograph, serigraph, woodcut, wood engraving, etching), and in a few cases stained glass design and sculpture.

Works in collections
The Amica Collection - Japanese Red
Smithsonian American Art Museum 1974.116.13 - Japanese Red

Books and publications
Encounters with the White Train - with Andy Robinson. Ltd. ed. of 500. Portland, OR. Press-22, 1986.
A Printmaker's World - Portland OR. McLarty's Choice, 1997  , 096449163X
World Watcher-Jack McLarty: 50 Years 1944-1994 Portland, Or. McLarty's Choice, 1995
Jack McLarty-Drawings Portland OR. McLarty's Choice 2005 , 0-9644916-6-4
Wind and Pines William Elliott and Noah Brannen Illus. Jack McLarty Portland OR Image Gallery 1977

Teachers and influences
Anton Refregier
Joseph Solman
Paul Franck
Akira Kurosaki
Junichiro Sekino
Diego Rivera
Jose Orozco

External links
 the Preservation of Oregon's Artistic Heritage project

1919 births
2011 deaths
20th-century American painters
American male painters
21st-century American painters
Artists from Portland, Oregon
Pacific Northwest College of Art alumni
Benson Polytechnic High School alumni
20th-century American printmakers
20th-century American male artists